Kavkazsky (masculine), Kavkazskaya (feminine), or Kavkazskoye (neuter) may refer to:
Kavkazsky District, a district of Krasnodar Krai, Russia
Kavkazsky (rural locality) (Kavkazskaya, Kavkazskoye), several rural localities in Russia
Kavkazskaya railway station, a railway station which serves the town of Kropotkin in Krasnodar Krai, Russia
Caucasian State Nature Biosphere Reserve (Kavkazsky zapovednik), a nature reserve in southern Russia

See also
Caucasus (disambiguation)
Caucasia (disambiguation)
Caucasian (disambiguation)